Jose Pimentel Ejercito Jr. (born February 17, 1963), also known as Jinggoy Ejercito Estrada or simply Jinggoy Estrada, is a Filipino politician and film actor serving as a Senator since 2022, and previously from 2004 to 2016. He was the president pro tempore of the Senate from 2007 to 2013, and briefly became  Senate President in acting capacity, after Juan Ponce Enrile's resignation. Before serving in the Senate, he was the vice mayor (1988–1992) and later mayor (1992–2001) of San Juan when it was still a municipality.

Estrada has been detained twice for corruption charges. In 2001, he and his father, ousted president Joseph Estrada, were arrested after being charged with plunder. He was released in 2003, elected to the Senate in 2004, and was acquitted in 2007. In 2014, he was charged and detained for allegedly embezzling  from his discretionary funds in a scandal known as the pork barrel scam. In 2016, he was released after being allowed to post bail. He sought reelection in the 2019 Senate election but lost. He ran again in 2022 and won a Senate seat.

Outside politics, Estrada is also an actor like his father. He won the prestigious Best Actor Award in the 2007 Metro Manila Film Festival for the film Katas ng Saudi, the accolade is one of the most-sought among Filipino actors.

Early life and education
Estrada was born on February 17, 1963, in Manila. He finished his primary and secondary education at the Ateneo de Manila University and earned a degree in A.B. Economics from the University of the Philippines Manila. He took up Bachelor of Laws for four years at the Lyceum of the Philippines University while serving as Vice Mayor of the then Municipality of San Juan at the age of 25. He was also bestowed an honorary Doctorate in Humanities in 2007 by the Laguna State Polytechnic University.

Political career

Mayor of San Juan (1992–2001) 
In 1992, he became the youngest ever elected-local chief executive during the 1992 Philippine local elections at age 29. During his three consecutive terms as mayor, he spearheaded the construction of modernized barangay halls with daycare centers and various recreational areas such as gymnasiums, basketball courts and playgrounds. The renovation and repair of the San Juan National High School and other public elementary schools also took place, as well as the improvement and replacement of drainages, concreting of municipal roads, and the construction of the four-storey San Juan Medical Center and the San Juan Municipal Gymnasium. During his incumbency, San Juan gained the reputation of being one of the most progressive municipalities and the "most peaceful municipality in the Philippines".

During his final tenure as mayor, he was sworn into office as the national president of the League of Municipalities of the Philippines (LMP) from 1998 to 2001.

Senator (2004–2016) 
In 2004, he was elected as a senator. During his first term, he introduced at least 617 bills and resolutions and steered the passage of at least 16 bills either as a principal sponsor or principal author. Jinggoy is hailed as the second most productive and prolific senator, next to Sen. Miriam Defensor-Santiago, who filed the most number of bills and resolutions in the Senate.

On July 23, 2007, Estrada was elected as Senate president pro tempore.

On August 15, 2007, the Supreme Court voted 13-0 to uphold Sandiganbayan's decision to grant his bail in connection with his plunder case before the graft court.  His father, former president Joseph Estrada was the main accused in that plunder case and was subsequently convicted. However, Estrada was immediately pardoned by then-President Gloria Macapagal Arroyo. On September 11, 2007, Estrada introduced Senate Bill 1556, proposing to make ROTC mandatory for all college students.

Jinggoy was acquitted in the plunder charge.

In 2010, he was re-elected as a senator, finishing in 2nd place. During the opening of the 15th Congress on July 26, 2010, he was re-elected as Senate president pro tempore.

During his stint in the Senate, he had been consistently hailed as one of the very few senators who scored perfect attendance, with no absence or late during the chamber's plenary sessions.

Involvement in the pork barrel scam 

Estrada is presently accused of another plunder charge at the Ombudsman relating to Janet Lim Napoles' pork barrel scam involving  of the people's money. Two other senators—Juan Ponce Enrile and Bong Revilla—as well as more than two dozens individuals are charged with him. Estrada is accused of pocketing PHP183 million in kickbacks from fake projects.

A report by the Commission on Audit of the Philippines was released on August 16, 2013, showing alleged misuse of funds by lawmakers who allegedly endorsed part of their congressional allocations to bogus non-governmental organizations. The accusations were the subject of a Senate probe that began later that month.

The Department of Justice of the Philippines filed its case against Estrada, Enrile and Revilla before the Ombudsman on September 16, 2013.

On June 23, 2014, Estrada was arrested and detained at the Philippine National Police Custodial Center in Camp Crame, Quezon City. The Philippine Senate on September 2, 2014, suspended Estrada from his Senate post for 90 days.

On September 16, 2017, Sandiganbayan anti-graft court released its resolution granting bail to Estrada.

On February 22, 2019, Estrada filed a request for a demurrer before the Sandiganbayan Fifth Division, asking the court to deviate from established procedure and to allow him to challenge the sufficiency of evidence midway into the trial. In March 2019, the court granted Estrada and his co-accused 10 days to file their respective demurrers; prosecution was also granted 10 days to respond.

Batas Kasambahay
Estrada is the principal author of the Kasambahay Law, or the law promoting the interests and welfare of the domestic workers in the Philippines. Republic Act 10361, or simply the "Kasambahay Law", prescribed standards, privileges, and rights of the domestic workers.

Hong Kong Airport incident
In August 2010, Estrada claimed that while traveling to Hong Kong, he experienced a backlash of the emotions surrounding the death of 8 Chinese nationals from Hong Kong during the 2010 Manila hostage crisis. According to him, as he passed through the immigration desk in Hong Kong, officers threw back his passport at him after checking it.

Estrada said the officer may not have known who he was because he used a "regular passport" for personal travel. He also said that he "understood the pain being felt by many Hong Kong nationals".

According to Apple Daily, the Hong Kong immigration department recorded that Estrada visited Hong Kong with a diplomat passport and that from an alleged video surveillance record, he and three other Filipinos were accompanied by staff from the Philippine embassy and had arranged to go through the privileged passage for diplomats. The immigration officer handed back the passport to the Philippines embassy staff, not to Estrada.

2019 Senate bid
Estrada ran for a comeback to the Senate in the 2019 Philippine Senate election. His half-brother, JV Ejercito, also sought for a Senate reelection. During the campaign, the half-siblings had a disagreement in the idea of them running at the same time. He was named to the Hugpong ng Pagbabago senatorial slate. However, he lost, placing 15th in the final tally, while Ejercito ended up in the 13th place, just a spot outside the winning circle. After conceding defeat, he wished that Senator Nancy Binay would make it over Ejercito, with both senators vying for the last spot in the partial and unofficial count. JV Ejercito responded by telling Estrada that he placed 13th in his own hometown San Juan, “Let him speak... It’s painful to accept that even in your own bailiwick you are unwanted,".

Senator (2022–present)

Estrada sought for a comeback to the Senate once again in the 2022 Philippine Senate election. He was named to the senatorial slate of UniTeam Alliance and openly endorsed the candidacies of Bongbong Marcos for president and Sara Duterte for vice president. For the second straight time, his half-brother, JV Ejercito, also ran for senator on the same election. He won as the 12th placer, finally earning his third nonconsecutive term, while Ejercito was also successful as he placed 10th. Estrada chairs the Senate Committee on Labor, Employment and Human Resources Development and the Senate Committee on National Defense and Security, Peace, Unification and Reconciliation.

In October 2022, Estrada made a statement wherein he was thinking of a proposal to ban all Korean dramas in the Philippines: "My observation is if we continue showing Korean telenovelas, our citizens praise the Koreans while Filipino artists continue losing jobs and money. So sometimes it comes to my mind that we should ban the telenovelas of the foreigners, and the Filipino artists who have great talent in acting are what we should be showing in our own country." Estrada clarified that he was only frustrated "that while we are only too eager and willing to celebrate South Korea's entertainment industry, we have sadly allowed our own to deteriorate because of the lack of support from the movie going public."

Personal life
On May 3, 2020, Estrada was arrested over alleged violations of the COVID-19 community quarantine rules. He said that he had been distributing relief goods to residents of the city when policemen in two patrol cars arrived at the scene and invited him to the local precinct.

Filmography

Movies

As actor 
Markang Rehas: Ikalawang Aklat (1985)
Paradise Inn (1985)
Bagets Gang (1986)
Isa Lang Ang Dapat Mabuhay (1986)
Sa Kuko Ng Agila (1989)
Eagle Squad (1989)
Estribo Gang: The Jinggoy Sese Story (1992) - Vice-Mayor
The Marita Gonzaga Rape-Slay: In God We Trust (1995)
The Four Stooges (1995) - Adrian
Wilson Sorronda: Leader Kuratong Baleleng's Solid Group (1995) - Wilson Sorronda
Strebel: Gestapo ng Maynila (1998) - Strebel
Ang Erpat Kong Astig (1998) - Joe
Hiwaga ng Panday (1998) - Guiller/Panday
Col. Elmer Jamias: Barako ng Maynila (2000) - as Col. Elmer Jamias
Sagot Kita... Mula Ulo Hanggang Paa (2000) - Ador
Walang Iwanan...Peksman (2002)
Utang ng Ama (2003) - Don
Katas ng Saudi (2007) - Oca
Magkaibigan (2008) - Ruben
Kimmy Dora (2009) - audience member during Kimmy Dora's speech
Ang Tanging Pamilya: A Marry Go Round (2009) - young Dindo
Ang Tatay kong Sexy (2016) - Paquito 
Coming Home (2020) - Pre Production & Official Entry For 1st Metro Manila Summer Film Festival 2020

As executive producer 
 Pepeng Agimat (1999)
 Palaban (2000)
 Col. Elmer Jamias: Barako ng Maynila (2000)
 Eto na Naman Ako (2000)
 Minsan Ko Lang Sasabihin (2000)

Television 
 Lorenzo's Time (2012) - as himself

Awards
 Award of Excellence, Asusasyon ng mga Kumentarista at Anaunser ng Pilipinas, 1998
 Annual Young Achievers Award for Government and Public Sector, 1999
 Most Outstanding Government Service Award, Guillermo Mendoza Memorial Scholarship Foundation, Inc., 2011
 Lifetime Achievement Award, Gawad Amerika, 2012
 Men Who Matter, People Asia, 2012
 Distinguished Alumnus in Good Governance Award, University of the Philippines Alumni Association, 2013

References

External links
 Official Website of Sen. Jinggoy Estrada
 Senate of the Philippines - Biography of Sen. Jinggoy Ejercito Estrada

|-

1963 births
Living people
Ateneo de Manila University alumni
Jinggoy
Jinggoy
Filipino television personalities
Filipino actor-politicians
Filipino people of Spanish descent
Filipino YouTubers
People from Manila
Filipino politicians convicted of crimes
People from San Juan, Metro Manila
University of the Philippines Manila alumni
Pwersa ng Masang Pilipino politicians
Presidents pro tempore of the Senate of the Philippines
Senators of the 16th Congress of the Philippines
Senators of the 15th Congress of the Philippines
Senators of the 14th Congress of the Philippines
Senators of the 13th Congress of the Philippines
United Nationalist Alliance politicians
Children of presidents of the Philippines
Lyceum of the Philippines University alumni
Filipino male film actors
Mayors of San Juan, Metro Manila
Senators of the 19th Congress of the Philippines